Paulo Domingos Gali da Costa Freitas is a Timorese football player who comes from Timor Leste and plays for Assalam.

International career
On 1 September 2018, Gali made his debut for the senior team in a 2018 AFF Championship qualification game against Brunei in the first-leg in a 3-1 win. On 27 January 2022, Gali scored his debut goal for the national team in a friendly match against Indonesia.

Career Statistics

International

International goals

Honours

Lalenok United

Copa FFTL 

 2020: Champions

Individual
 AFF U-16 Youth Championship Top scorer: 2019 (7 goals)

Controversy
In 2019 Timor Leste's under 15 team for the 2019 AFF U-15 Championship were accused of fielding overage players at the tournament, with team captain Paulo Domingos Gali da Costa Freitas being one of the prominent players accused of being over age with claims that he was at least 22 years old at the time. These protests lead to a formal investigation by the ASEAN Football Federation into the incident. The protests however were later dismissed with Paulo being deemed to be eligible to participate in the tournament.

References

2004 births
Living people
East Timorese footballers
Timor-Leste international footballers
Association football forwards